Livingstone is a surname and given name. The surname is toponymic. It is one of the habitual surnames eventually adopted by members of the Scottish branch of the Irish Dunleavy (Gaelic language Duinnshléibhe)/MacNulty  royals, including the ancestors of the African missionary doctor and African explorer David Livingstone. There may be a relationship between the Livingstones and  Clan MacLea.

Notable people

Surname
Adelaide Livingstone (Dame Adelaide Stickney Lord Livingstone) (died 1970), responsible for organizing the 1934–5 Peace Ballot in the UK
Alexander Livingstone (Scottish politician)
Archie Livingstone (footballer, born 1915) (1915–1961), Scottish footballer
Bob Livingstone (1922–2013), American football player
Bobby Livingstone, Scottish footballer
Bruce Livingstone (born 1971), Canadian entrepreneur
Colin H. Livingstone, first president of the Boy Scouts of America
David Livingstone 1813–1873, Scottish missionary explorer of Africa, best-known bearer of the name and namesake of numerous places
David N. Livingstone (born 1953), Professor of Geography and Intellectual History at Queen's University Belfast
Doug Livingstone (1898–1981), Scottish football player
Douglas Livingstone (1932–1996), South African poet
Duncan Livingstone (d. 1964) South African poet who contributed to Scottish Gaelic literature
Eddie Livingstone (1884–1945), Canadian owner and manager of the Toronto Shamrocks and the Toronto Blue Shirts
Frank Livingstone (bowls), New Zealand lawn bowler
Ian Livingstone (born 1949), English fantasy author
Ian Livingstone (disambiguation), various people                           
Ken Livingstone (born 1945), former Mayor of London                         
Liam Livingstone, English cricketer
Margaret Livingstone (born 1950), American neuroscientist and professor at Harvard Medical School
Marilyn Livingstone (born 1952), Scottish Labour politician
Mary Livingstone (Sadye Marks) (1905–1983), American radio comedian, widow and radio partner of Jack Benny
Nicole Livingstone (née Stevenson), Australian swimmer
Paul Livingstone American sitarist, composer and multi-instrumentalist
Peadar Livingstone, Irish priest, linguist, and local historian
Richard Winn Livingstone, gave the Rede Lecture in 1944 on Plato and modern education
Robert Livingstone (born 1967), Canadian businessman
Scott Livingstone (born 1965), former professional baseball player
Sergio Livingstone (1920-2011), former Chilean goalkeeper, nicknamed 'El Sapo'
Sidney Livingstone (born 1945), English actor 
Stacey Livingstone (born 1988), Australian rules footballer
Susan Livingstone, American administrator and civil servant
Terasa Livingstone (born 1975), Australian theatre, film and television actress
Joseph Livingstone (1942-2009), English footballer

Given name
Livingstone Adjin (born 1989), Ghanaian footballer
Livingstone Harris (born 1957), West Indian cricketer
Livingstone Lawrence (born 1962), West Indian cricketer
Livingstone Lusinde (born 1972), Tanzanian politician
Livingstone Sargeant (born 1947), West Indian cricketer
Livingstone Walker (1879–1940), English cricketer

See also 
Donlevy
Clan MacLea
Gaels
Highlands of Scotland
Lowland Scots language
Livingston, West Lothian, presumed origin of the name
Living stone, common name for succulent plants of the genus Lithops
Levingston
Livingston (surname)
MacDunleavy (dynasty)

External links
  Highland Livingstone

References

Scottish toponymic surnames
Surnames of Lowland Scottish origin
English-language masculine given names